Santo Stefano di Rogliano is a village and comune in the province of Cosenza in the Calabria region of southern Italy.
 
The village is bordered by Aprigliano, Cellara, Mangone, Marzi, Paterno Calabro and Rogliano.

See also
 Savuto river

References

Cities and towns in Calabria